Christian Weis (born 20 June 1968) is a former professional tennis player from Germany.

Biography
Weis, a right-handed player from Augsburg, turned professional in 1986 and featured mostly on the Challenger tour.

In 1987 he appeared in the main draw of two Grand Prix tournaments, partnering Hans Schwaier in the doubles at Palermo and qualifying for the singles at Sao Paulo, where he lost his first round match to Tore Meinecke in three sets.

Most successful on clay, he was the singles runner-up in two Challenger events in Brazil and partnered with Jaroslav Navrátil to win the doubles title at the Neu-Ulm Challenger.

After retiring from the professional circuit he continued to play Bundesliga tennis for TC Augsburg.

Challenger titles

Doubles: (1)

References

External links
 
 

1968 births
Living people
German male tennis players
West German male tennis players
Sportspeople from Augsburg
Tennis people from Bavaria